Steve Simon is an American former tennis player, and the current chief executive of the Women's Tennis Association.

He was born in California, and played college tennis for Long Beach State University. He qualified for the Mixed Doubles event at the 1981 Wimbledon Championships alongside Lea Antonoplis, where they lost in the first round.

Simon was the tournament director of the Indian Wells Open from 2004 to 2015, when he left to become the chief executive of the Women's Tennis Association.

References 

Living people
Year of birth missing (living people)
American male tennis players

American chief executives
Long Beach State Beach men's tennis players
Tennis people from California
Sportspeople from California